The 2019 NCAA Bowling Championship was the 16th annual tournament to determine the national champion of women's NCAA collegiate ten-pin bowling. The tournament was played at the RollHouse Wickliffe in Wickliffe, Ohio from April 11–13, 2019.

Qualification
Since there is only one national collegiate championship for women's bowling, all NCAA bowling programs (whether from Division I, Division II, or Division III) were eligible. A total of 8 teams were given at-large bids for this championship, which consisted of a modified double-elimination style tournament.

Bids

Tournament bracket

National Championship

References

NCAA Bowling Championship
2019 in American sports
2019 in bowling
2019 in sports in Ohio
April 2019 sports events in the United States